Greece and Peru established diplomatic relations on 5 December 1965. Greece was represented in Peru by its embassy in Brazil until 1992, when the embassy in Lima was opened. Around 150-350 people of Greek descent live in Peru, including Vladimiro Montesinos, the long-standing head of the Peruvian intelligence service, Servicio de Inteligencia Nacional under Alberto Fujimori. Since 1987, Peru has an embassy in Athens.

Bilateral visits
The first official visit by a Greek official to Peru was made by the then Minister of Foreign Affairs George Papandreou in 2003.

List of bilateral agreements
A number of agreements exist:
 Agreement on visa supretion for diplomatic passports (1986)
 Educational Agreement which was signed in Athens in 1988 (renewed in 2003)
 Agreement on tourism cooperation (1998)
 A Memorandum of Co-operation between the Ministries of Foreign Affairs of the two countries provides for the establishment of a mechanism of bilateral political consultations (in force since it was signed in Lima on 30 October 2003).

See also
Foreign relations of Greece
Foreign relations of Peru
List of ambassadors of Peru to Greece

References

External links
 Greek Ministry of Foreign Affairs about the relation with Peru
 Embassy of Peru in Greece (in Spanish only)

 
Peru
Greece